Chilton High School or Chilton School is a public high school located in Chilton, Texas (USA) and classified as a 2A school by the UIL.  It is part of the Chilton Independent School District located in northwestern Falls County.  In 2015, the school was rated "Met Standard" by the Texas Education Agency.

Athletics
The Chilton Pirates compete in these sports - 

Volleyball, Football, Cheerleading, Basketball, Powerlifting, Golf, Tennis & Track.

State Titles
Football - 
1972(B), 2006(1A/D2)
Boys Track - 
1993(1A)

They also are four-time 1A State Champions in Individual Girls Golf 2006-2009 (Gabby Dominguez)

Chilton also had a 400 Meter State Champion in 2015 (Norvell Alston Jr)

References

External links
Chilton ISD

High schools in Central Texas
Schools in Falls County, Texas
Public high schools in Texas
Public middle schools in Texas
Public elementary schools in Texas